The 2017 Antalya Open was a men's tennis tournament played on grass courts. It was the 1st edition of the Antalya Open, and part of the ATP World Tour 250 series of the 2017 ATP World Tour. It took place at the Kaya Palazzo Resort in Belek, Antalya Province, Turkey, from June 25–July 1.

Singles main-draw entrants

Seeds

 Rankings are as of June 19, 2017.

Other entrants
The following players received wildcards into the singles main draw:
  David Ferrer
  Marsel İlhan
  Cem İlkel

The following players received entry from the qualifying draw:
  Matthew Ebden
  Kamil Majchrzak
  Ramkumar Ramanathan
  Mohamed Safwat

The following players received entry as lucky losers:
  Daniel Altmaier
  Lloyd Harris

Withdrawals
Before the tournament
 Chung Hyeon →replaced by  Daniel Altmaier
 Karen Khachanov →replaced by  Lloyd Harris
 Lu Yen-hsun →replaced by  Víctor Estrella Burgos

Retirements
 Marcos Baghdatis
 Martin Kližan

Doubles main-draw entrants

Seeds

 Rankings are as of June 19, 2017.

Other entrants
The following pairs received wildcards into the doubles main draw:
  Tuna Altuna /  David Ferrer 
  Sarp Ağabigün /  Altuğ Çelikbilek

The following pair received entry as alternates:
  Víctor Estrella Burgos /  Andreas Seppi

Withdrawals
  Steve Darcis

Champions

Singles 

  Yūichi Sugita def.  Adrian Mannarino, 6–1, 7–6(7–4)

Doubles 

  Robert Lindstedt /  Aisam-ul-Haq Qureshi def.  Oliver Marach /  Mate Pavić, 7–5, 4–1 ret.

External links 
Official website 

Antalya Open
Antalya Open
Antalya Open
June 2017 sports events in Turkey
July 2017 sports events in Turkey